My Favourite Faded Fantasy is the third studio album by Irish singer, songwriter and producer Damien Rice. The album was released in Ireland on 31 October 2014 and subsequently in other territories on 3 November and then released on vinyl on 7 November 2014, almost eight years since the release of his previous album, 9. The album was produced by Rick Rubin.

Critical reception

At Metacritic, which assigns a normalized rating out of 100 to reviews from music critics, the album has received an average score of 76, indicating "generally favorable", based on 15 reviews. Jessica Goodman and Ryan Kistobak of The Huffington Post included the album on their list of 2014's best releases, declaring the album "a devastating reminder that love leaves you crumbling and fantasies are just fiction". Goodman complimented Rice's "delicate vocals" as "sinister and familiar".

Track listing

Personnel
Damien Rice – vocals, acoustic guitar (1–8), electric guitar (1), piano (1, 2, 4–7), clarinet (1, 8), tambourine (1), sounds and percussion (2), pump organ (5, 6), bass (7, 8), harmonium (8)
Joel Shearer – crotales (1, 8), tambourine (1), shaker (1), electric guitar swells (1), bass (2, 6, 7), sounds and percussion (2), electric guitar (2, 4, 8), cuatro (7), muted guitar (7), dulcimer (7), cymbals (7), Wurlitzer (8), bells (8), vibraphone (8), piano (8), celeste (8), glockenspiel (8), chimes (8), acoustic guitar (8), harmonium (8)
Zac Rae – Wurlitzer (1, 4), pad (1), tack piano (1), vibraphone (2), Hammond organ (3, 4), piano (4)
David Rawlings – archtop guitar (1, 7), backing vocals (7)
Cora Venus Lunny – violin (1–4, 7), backing vocals (1, 2, 7), viola (2, 3)
Borgar Magnason – double bass (1, 3, 5, 7)
Sólrún Sumarliðadóttir – cello (1)
Julia Mogensen – cello (1, 2, 5, 6, 8)
Shahzad Ismaily – bass (1, 2, 4), drums (6, 8), shaker (6), floor tom (7), Hammond organ (8), cymbals (8), crotales (8), Moog (8), cowbell (8)
Magnús Trygvason Eliassen – drums (1)
Earl Harvin – percussion (1), drums (4), tambourine (4)
Helgi Jónsson – trombone (1, 2, 3, 6, 8), backing vocals (2)
James Gadson – drums (2)
Alex Somers – sampler (2–4, 8), bass drum (3), sub bass (3), harp (4)
Deron Johnson – piano (2, 3), Hammond organ (1)
Tina Dico – backing vocals (2)
Bryndis Halla Gylfadottir – cello (3, 4)
Frank Aarnink – tympani (3), gong (3), cymbals (3)
Una Sveinbjarnardottir – violin (5, 6, 8), viola (8)
Markéta Irglová – piano (6), vocals (8)
Gyda Valtisdottir – cello (6, 8), backing vocals (8)
Victor Indrizzo – drums (7)
Marlana Sheetz – backing vocals (1, 8)
Andrew Heringer – backing vocals (7)
Robbie Arnett – backing vocals (7, 8)
Rónán Ó Snodaigh – bodhran (7), backing vocals (7)
Colm Ó Snodaigh – tin whistle (7)
Emil Friðfinnsson – French horn (8)

Commercial performance
In Canada, the album debuted at number eight on the Canadian Albums Chart, selling just 4,000 copies.

Charts

Weekly charts

Year-end charts

References

External links
 

2014 albums
Damien Rice albums
Albums produced by Rick Rubin
Albums recorded at Shangri-La (recording studio)
Vector Recordings albums